Macmerry railway station served the village of Macmerry, East Lothian, Scotland, from 1872 to 1925 on the Macmerry Branch.

History 
The station was opened on 1 May 1872 by the North British Railway. It was also known as Macmerry Gladsmuir in the handbook of stations. On the south end was the station building and the signal box and to the south of the platform was the goods yard as well as its sidings. Also to the south was a mineral line which served Merryfield, Engine, Bald and Dander pits. The mineral line closed in 1907 and was replaced by a new one, which was to the east and served Penston Colliery and Penston Briar Pit. The station closed on 1 July 1925.

References

External links

RAILSCOT - Macmerry

Disused railway stations in East Lothian
Former North British Railway stations
Railway stations in Great Britain opened in 1872
Railway stations in Great Britain closed in 1925
1872 establishments in Scotland
1925 disestablishments in Scotland